The 2009 Northern Mariana Championship was the fourth season of top-flight football in Northern Marianas Islands. The competition was won by Inter Godfather's, previously known as Fiesta Inter Saipan.

Final table
Unlike previous seasons where playoffs had been employed, this season was a normal league format in which each team played the others twice. Remington were new entrants to the league and FC Arirang were renamed Korean FA.

Top scorers

References

Marianas Soccer League seasons
North
North
football